TuVisión was an American Spanish language broadcasting network, which is owned by Pappas Telecasting. TuVisión is a portmanteau of tu (your) and  televisión. During the latter part of 2007, Pappas hired Moelis & Company to develop long-term objectives to identify which television assets it should retain. In 2008, several affiliates filed for Chapter 11 protection. and TuVisión ceased broadcasting in 2009.

History
TuVisión began operations on July 1, 2007, after Pappas dropped the Azteca America network from the Spanish-language stations that Pappas owned. The only exception was Los Angeles' KAZA-TV, which retained the network until its 2018 sale to Weigel Broadcasting; Pappas was under contract to carry Azteca América through December 2012 and its later bankruptcy effectively kept the affiliation after 2012 on creditor's orders.

Programs
The main programs of TuVisión were Dueña y Señora (Puerto Rican telenovela), Alma Gemela (Brazilian telenovela), The Johnny Canales Show (music), Marta Susana (Guatemalan show) and Paparazzi TV.

References

External links
 Pappas Telecasting Companies Retrieved: 2010-04-01.

Pappas Telecasting
Television channels and stations established in 2007
Spanish-language television networks in the United States
Defunct television networks in the United States
Television channels and stations disestablished in 2009